Vandam (also, Vendam) is a village and the most populous municipality, except for the capital Gabala, in the Gabala Rayon of Azerbaijan. It has a population of 9,507.

Picture gallery

References 

Populated places in Qabala District
Elizavetpol Governorate